Homestead Dairy Barns, also known as Miller Mill and Inn at Gristmill Square, is a historic dairy barn complex and national historic district located at Warm Springs, Bath County, Virginia, USA. The district encompasses seven contributing buildings. The complex consists of the Main Barn with its attached tile double silos, a Bottling Building, Milking Barn, Calving Barn, Ham House, Herdsman's Cottage, and Bull Barn. The complex was built by the Virginia Hot Springs Company in 1928 to support the operations of the nearby Homestead resort. They are frame buildings, many of which are clad in stucco and painted white with unifying green trim. They include repetition of Colonial Revival and Craftsman details throughout.

It was listed on the National Register of Historic Places in 2007.

References

External links

Barns on the National Register of Historic Places in Virginia
Historic districts on the National Register of Historic Places in Virginia
Colonial Revival architecture in Virginia
Buildings and structures completed in 1928
Buildings and structures in Bath County, Virginia
National Register of Historic Places in Bath County, Virginia
Barns in Virginia
U.S. Route 220
1928 establishments in Virginia